Sean O'Grady (born February 10, 1959) is the former World Boxing Association (WBA) Lightweight Champion of the World, and currently an American commercial realtor.  
O'Grady had a record of 81 wins and five losses as a professional boxer, with 70 wins by knockout.

O'Grady is also a college graduate, boxing analyst, television personality, actor and former teen idol across the United States Midwest.

Early life
O'Grady was born in Austin, Texas. The son of boxing trainer Pat O'Grady and boxing promoter Jean O'Grady, he moved around a lot when he was a younger kid, but his family settled in Oklahoma City, when he was 11 years old.

Boxing career
O'Grady started boxing professionally in 1975. In 1980, he had his first world title try, when the World Boxing Council Lightweight champion Jim Watt gave him an opportunity to fight for the title. O'Grady travelled to Scotland to fight Watt, but sustained a cut over the forehead due to a head butt late in the bout and lost by a technical knockout in round 12. The O'Grady's protested the fight's result 24 hours later while in Ireland, arguing that the cut had been caused by the headbutt, not a punch. Because of the controversy surrounding the fight, the World Boxing Association Lightweight champion, Hilmer Kenty, gave O'Grady another opportunity at the title. They met on April 12, 1981. O'Grady again suffered a cut early in the bout, but he dropped Kenty in rounds two and eight and won a unanimous decision. The fight was one of the ten best fights of 1981 according to Ring Magazine.

In part because of problems with his manager/father, he never defended the WBA title and was eventually stripped of it. Pat O'Grady then formed the little-regarded (and very short lived) World Athletic Association to recognize Sean as a champion. O'Grady promptly lost this "championship" to Andy Ganigan of Hawaii.

He regularly chewed bubble gum upon entering the ring prior to fights, and because of this, he earned the nickname "Bubble Gum Bomber."

TV analyst
O'Grady served as analyst for television boxing show USA Tuesday Night Fights which aired from October 1982 to August 1998 on the USA Network.

Professional boxing record

References

External links 
 

1959 births
Northwest Classen High School alumni
Boxing commentators
Living people
American male boxers
Sportspeople from Austin, Texas
World lightweight boxing champions
Boxers from Texas